The women's relay competition at the 2002 Asian Games in Busan was held on 12 October 2002.

Schedule
All times are Korea Standard Time (UTC+09:00)

Results

References 

2002 Asian Games Official Report, Page 514

External links 
Results

Modern pentathlon at the 2002 Asian Games